Patrícia "Patchy" Araujo Toledo (born 15 August 1978) is a Brazilian football manager and former professional player who played as a midfielder and forward. Toledo is currently the head coach of the United States girls' national under-16 soccer team.

Early life
Toledo signed for her first professional club at the age of 17 and played for Corinthians, Palmeiras and Flamengo in her native Brazil.

College career
Toledo moved to the United States and after a spell at Cloud County Community College in Kansas, she attended the University of West Florida between 2003 and 2006. She won NCAA Division II All-South Region honours in 2005 and 2006.

Club career
The Icelandic club Íþróttafélag Reykjavíkur signed Toledo for the 2007 season, but the club finished bottom of the league with seven points from 16 games. Toledo returned to the US for season 2008, with WPSL team SD United.

OOH Lincoln Ladies brought Toledo to England in October 2009. She made four league appearances and scored one goal, before departing in late December on account of the cold weather.

International career
Toledo is a former Brazilian U19 international player.

Managerial career
In August 2022, Toledo was named the head coach of the United States girls' national under-16 soccer team.

References

Living people
1979 births
Brazilian women's footballers
Notts County L.F.C. players
Expatriate women's footballers in England
Footballers from São Paulo (state)
Expatriate women's soccer players in the United States
Expatriate women's footballers in Iceland
Patricia Toledo
Sport Club Corinthians Paulista (women) players
FA Women's National League players
Women's association football midfielders
Women's association football forwards
Brazilian expatriates in Iceland
Women's Premier Soccer League players
Sociedade Esportiva Palmeiras (women) players
Clube de Regatas do Flamengo (women) players